Wilbour is a surname. Notable people with the surname include:

 Charles Edwin Wilbour (1833–1896), American journalist and Egyptologist
 Charlotte Beebe Wilbour (1833–1914), American feminist, speaker, and writer
 Isaac Wilbour (1763–1837), American politician from Rhode Island

See also

 Wilbur (disambiguation)
 Wilber (disambiguation)
 Wilbor (disambiguation)